My Own Pal is a 1926 American silent Western film directed by John G. Blystone and written by Lillie Hayward. The film stars Tom Mix, Olive Borden, Tom Santschi, Virginia Marshall, Ben Bard, and William Colvin. The film was released on February 28, 1926, by Fox Film Corporation.

Plot
As described in a film magazine review, Tom O'Hara, a young rancher, adopts Jill, a child of the circus, and takes her to a city. There he becomes a hero through the rescue of the police chief’s daughter Alice Deering in a runaway automobile. The chief makes him a motorcycle policeman. In this capacity he captures a gang of desperadoes and, after a period of courtship, weds the chief’s daughter.

Cast
 Tom Mix as Tom O'Hara
 Olive Borden as Alice Deering
 Tom Santschi as August Deering
 Virginia Marshall as Jill
 Ben Bard as Baxter Barton
 William Colvin as Jud McIntire
 Virginia Warwick as Molly
 Jay Hunt as Clown
 Hedda Nova as Mrs. Jud McIntire
 Tom McGuire as Pat McQuire
 Helen Lynch as Trixie Tremaine
 Jack Rollens as Slippery Sam

Preservation
With no prints of My Own Pal located in any film archives, it is a lost film.

See also
 1937 Fox vault fire
 Tom Mix filmography

References

External links

 

1926 films
Fox Film films
Lost Western (genre) films
1926 Western (genre) films
Films directed by John G. Blystone
American black-and-white films
Lost American films
1926 lost films
Silent American Western (genre) films
1920s English-language films
1920s American films